Title I: The State and Its Government, is the collection of New Hampshire Revised Statutes Annotated which relate to the state's government as a whole. Like other portions of the RSAs, the Title is divided into Chapters and Sections organized in numbers and subsections organized in lowercase letters.

Current RSAs In Title I

RSA Chapter 1 State Boundaries

RSA 1:1 Perambulation of the New Hampshire Line With the Adjoining States of Maine, Massachusetts and Vermont
The borders will be reviewed and refined whenever they're needed. This was added recently, due in large part to border disputes with Maine regarding Kittery, Maine (due to the Piscataqua River border dispute), and Vermont regarding where the border lies in the Connecticut River and to a smaller extent, Killington, Vermont. See Vermont v. New Hampshire.

RSA 1:2 Notice
The Governor and Executive Council are supposed to put the commissioner of the Department of Transportation in charge of any modifications espoused by the state to the boundary, advised by the Attorney General. The DOT Commissioner is the spokesperson of the state in regard to meeting with other parties in border matters.

RSA 1:3 Return
Any changes to landmarks that constitute the state boundary must be noted by representatives of both parties (New Hampshire and Maine, Massachusetts, Vermont or Quebec), and given to the Secretary of State.

RSA 1:4 Expense
New Hampshire should pay for half of the costs of a border review, although the Governor is authorized to take money out of the treasury for extra expenses if needed.

RSA 1:5 Perambulation of the New Hampshire-Massachusetts State Line
The border of New Hampshire with Massachusetts is as was established and marked on the land in as provided in the laws of 1901.

RSA 1:6 Perambulation of New Hampshire-Maine State Line
The border of New Hampshire with Maine is as was established and marked on the land in as provided in the laws of 1947, and extending from Bryant's Rock at East Pond to the Canadian line.

RSA 1:7 Perambulation of New Hampshire-Vermont State Line
The border of New Hampshire with Vermont is as established and marked on land in accordance with the decision in Vermont v. New Hampshire, 290 U.S. 579 (1933).

RSA 1:8 Preservation of Monuments on State Boundaries
It is a misdemeanor for a person to willfully or maliciously disturb, injure, remove, obliterate, deface or cover up any monument or mark designating a boundary line between New Hampshire and a border state, unless they make an application to the DOT commissioner.

It is also a misdemeanor to attempt or actually engage in an act on the banks or bed of the Connecticut river that would alter the boundary line with Vermont, without making an application to the DOT commissioner.

RSA 1:9 Determination of Need for Monuments
Under application provided in RSA 1:8, the DOT commissioner in consultation with the AG meet with their respective counterparts in the affected border state and will decide if a monument or marker is needed or can be removed.

RSA 1:10 Permit for Resetting Markers and Bounds
If needed, the DOT commissioner with the approval of the adjoining state, can issue a permit for the alteration or resetting of the original boundary or mark. The applicant is charged with all costs associated for the alteration or resetting as determined by the DOT commissioner. Any changes to the border by permits are to be fully described in writing, signed by the representatives of both states, and recorded with the secretary of state.

RSA 1:11 Penalty for Alteration Without Application and Permit
Whoever violates RSA 1:8 is guilty of a misdemeanor if a person, or a felony if any other entity, such as a corporation.

RSA 1:14 Oceanic Boundaries
RSA 1:14 divides New Hampshire's maritime boundaries in regard to the offshore waters into three categories, Marginal Seas, High Seas and Submerged Land, all of which have been agreed upon, through agreement with Maine and Massachusetts as well as through international maritime law.

Marginal Seas
Marginal Seas are anything within three nautical miles (6 km) of the coastal baseline (median between high and low tides at the shore).

High Seas
The High Seas within New Hampshire are classified as anything within 200 nautical miles (370 km) of the coastal baseline unless the coastal baseline is further than 200 nautical miles (370 km) away. In that case, the boundary is extended to the edge of the continental shelf.

Submerged Land
Any land that lies within the Marginal or High Seas claimed by New Hampshire is part of New Hampshire, although to date, only parts of the Isles of Shoals would be included as part of this clause.

Controversy
In 1975, a legal battle between Maine and New Hampshire was fought in the US Supreme Court over the boundaries of the two states. It arose from a dispute by fishermen over which state's laws towards lobster catches applied, Maine's laws or New Hampshire's RSA 211:27.

1:15 Oceanic Boundaries With Other States
1:15 provides a specification for maritime boundaries with other states, as well as its claim of title to the resources within its oceanic territory in this RSA's third section.

Maine
Stated as starting at the midpoint of the mouth of the Piscataqua River, heading southeast in a straight line into the mouth of Gosport Harbor in the Isles of Shoals, with a set of lights between Fort Point Light and Whaleback Light marking the boundary within the ocean.

Past Gosport, the boundary then intersects the halfway point of the breakwater between Cedar Island and Star Island, continuing on that course until the end of New Hampshire's oceanic boundary stated in 1:14.

Massachusetts
From the land boundary, the nautical boundary heads 118 degrees east of True North, per 1901's Chapter 115, which since has been repealed.
However, despite the repeal, the border between Massachusetts and New Hampshire has not been disputed, unlike New Hampshire's borders with Maine and Vermont.  [The citation listed reads, "excepting from general repeal the following described statutes" and includes 115, 1901, which would seem to mean that 115, 1901 was NOT repealed.]

RSA 3 State Emblems 
RSA 3's subchapters have to do with all of New Hampshire's symbolic and heraldic imagery and classifications.

RSA 3:1 State Emblem

The State Emblem is an elliptical panel, vertically oriented, with a picture of the Old Man of the Mountain surrounded on the top by the state name and on the bottom by the state motto, "Live Free or Die."  It may be placed on all printed or related material issued by the state and its subdivisions relative to the development of recreational, industrial, and agricultural resources of the state.
 RSA 3:1 State Emblem
 Emblem of New Hampshire

RSA 3:9 State Seal

In order to make the official state seal, the following factors need to be in place according to 3:9.

2 inches (51 mm) across and a circular shape (which brings into doubt whether it's actually still "the seal" when it is on the state flag)
A horizon above the middle of the flag, with the sea below the horizon and a third of the sun above the direct center of the horizon
Laurel wreaths on the sides
Within the Laurel, a full broadside view of the frigate Raleigh
The bow of the Raleigh must be higher than the stern and on the "dexter" side (to the "holder" of the seal's right) , and must show three masts, the masts' supports.
The flag authorized by Congress as of 1777 on the stern (Colonial Circle Star Spangled Banner)
The masts must have banners heading towards the dexter side.
The Raleigh must not have oars
There is a division of land and sea fairly parallel to the horizon marked by a double line that is highest when "sinister" (opposite of "dexter")4th one
No detail on the water
No detail on the land except for a granite boulder on the dexter side.
Around the seal the words "Seal of the State of New Hampshire" with periods between each word except for "New" and "Hampshire", as well as before "Seal" and after "Hampshire"
At the bottom of the seal, the numerals "1776" with two five-sided stars on each side surrounded by the beginning and the end of the phrase with the periods.

See also
Seal of New Hampshire

External links
RSA 3:9 State Seal

Repealed RSAs and portions of RSAs In Title I
1:12:
1:13:
7B:
8:
8A:
8B:
8C:

New Hampshire statutes